Kaiketsu may refer to:

Kaiketsu Zorori, a Japanese children's book series
Kaiketsu Zubat, a tokusatsu superhero series
Kaiketsu Noutenki, a series of fan film parodies of the above
Kaiketsu Lion-Maru, another tokusatsu series
Kaiketsu Zorro, a Japanese anime
Kaiketsu, a 1947 Japanese film with cinematography by Yoshio Miyajima
Kaiketsu Masateru (born 1948), Japanese former sumo wrestler